Thulisile Nomkhosi "Thuli" Madonsela (born 28 September 1962) is a South African advocate and professor of law, holding a chair in social justice at Stellenbosch University since January 2018. She served as the Public Protector of South Africa from 19 October 2009 to 14 October 2016. In 1996, she helped draft the final constitution of South Africa promulgated by then-President Nelson Mandela.

Early life and education
Madonsela was born in Johannesburg in 1962, the daughter of informal traders Bafana and Nomasonto, and grew up in Soweto. She attended Evelyn Baring High School in Nhlangano in Swaziland, from where her family originates. She graduated with a BA in Law from the University of Swaziland in 1987, and an LLB from the University of the Witwatersrand in 1990. In March 2015,  Madonsela was awarded a Doctor of Laws degree, LL.D. (Honoris causa) from the University of Stellenbosch, followed by another Doctor of Laws degree, LL.D. (honoris causa) from the University of Cape Town in June 2015. She also has honorary doctorates from Rhodes University and the University of Fort Hare.

Politics
Madonsela was, until 2007, an ordinary member of the Pretoria branch of the African National Congress (ANC). During the apartheid era Madonsela served in the ANC and in the United Democratic Front anti-apartheid organisation. She believes that holding political office would not be her "best contribution as a human being". In 1994 she declined the position of ANC MP in South Africa's first post-apartheid Parliament. In January 2014 it was reported that several ANC branches in Gauteng had unsuccessfully nominated her as a candidate to represent the ANC in the National Assembly or one of the provincial legislatures in the 2014 general election. Her spokesperson said she was unaware of the nomination and would not have accepted it.

Early career
Madonsela worked for trade unions and in both the public and private sectors from the 1980s. She was a member of the team who drafted the final constitution of South Africa promulgated by then President Nelson Mandela in 1996. After Mandela's death, Madonsela said in a tribute to him: "We will always admire him for gladly submitting his administration to the scrutiny of checks and balances such as the courts and institutions supporting democracy when its actions came into question." Prior to her appointment as Public Protector, Madonsela served as a full-time member of the South African Law Reform Commission, appointed to the position in 2007 by then President Thabo Mbeki.

Public Protector
Madonsela was appointed Public Protector by President Jacob Zuma for a non-renewable seven-year term commencing 19 October 2009, with unanimous support from the multi-party National Assembly. At the announcement of her appointment, Zuma said Madonsela "will need to ensure that this office continues to be accessible to ordinary citizens and undertakes its work without fear or favour". Madonsela likens her role as Public Protector to the Venda chief's paternal aunt known as the makhadzi, a non-political figure who "gives the people a voice while giving the traditional leader a conscience".

In 2012, she investigated "kickbacks" received by Julius Malema in the context of traffic department contracts given to external contractor On-Point Engineering.

"Secure in Comfort" report

As Public Protector, Madonsela investigated complaints regarding public spending on Zuma's private homestead in the KwaZulu-Natal town of Nkandla.
Her final report on security upgrades to Zuma's homestead titled Secure in Comfort was published on 19 March 2014. Madonsela found that Zuma had benefited unduly from the R246 million the state had spent on the upgrades. Her report has been met with much criticism and opposition from representatives of the ANC ruling party. Shortly before her final report was made public, ANC secretary general Gwede Mantashe and cabinet minister Lindiwe Sisulu made public statements undermining Madonsela and her report, with Mantashe calling it a "political report". After its publication, the African National Congress Youth League (ANCYL) called for Madonsela's resignation, and members of the ANCYL and the ANC-aligned Congress of South African Students (COSAS) made disparaging remarks about her. COSAS, which had been admonished by female cabinet minister Nosiviwe Mapisa-Nqakula for a "sexist" remark, subsequently retracted "a personal address to comrade Madonsela". ANC chief whip Stone Sizani said "we strongly believe that she has overstepped the mark" by making some "disparaging remarks" with "political overtones". A group of lawyers from KwaZulu-Natal started a public campaign to discredit her report, and she was accused of having a political agenda by cabinet minister Fikile Mbalula. On 4 July 2014, ANC MPs in the justice portfolio committee objected to Madonsela's "views that are political in nature" and committee chairperson Mathole Motshekga suggested that the powers of the Public Protector, which are governed by the country's constitution, be reviewed.

Zuma made a submission to Parliament on 14 August 2014 regarding Madonsela's report on Nkandla. Madonsela wrote a letter to Zuma dated 21 August 2014, stating that his submission to Parliament was not an adequate response to her report and requesting a response to her letter by 4 September 2014. During a media briefing on 26 August 2014, Gwede Mantashe criticised her handling of the matter, saying the ANC want her to "behave correctly" and "not abuse" her term of office, while his deputy Jessie Duarte expressed concerns about Madonsela being "populist in her orientation". Madonsela subsequently held a press conference on 28 August 2014, in which she defended her actions and requested those ANC members interfering with her duties to stop doing so. The same day, civil rights organisation AfriForum laid criminal charges against Mantashe and Duarte for contravening the Public Protector Act by insulting the Public Protector. The general secretary of ANC Tripartite Alliance partner COSATU Zwelinzima Vavi and general secretary of its largest affiliate NUMSA Irvin Jim subsequently defended Madonsela and criticised the ANC's response. Madonsela later elaborated to the media that her letter to Zuma complements the parallel parliamentary process, "because finally they would have the president's comments on my report. But now they only have the president's own initiative, which is a general statement on his observations on what happened there, but he's not saying whether he agrees or disagrees with me. He is not saying what he is going to do to fix his branch of government." On 6 September 2014, deputy Minister of Defence and Military Veterans Kebby Maphatsoe publicly accused Madonsela of "acting like a counter-revolutionary" and working for the CIA. Madonsela said she would charge Maphatsoe with contempt if he does not retract his accusations. The ANC distanced itself from Maphatsoe's statements and he publicly withdrew them on 9 September 2014. In a written response sent to Madonsela on 11 September 2014, Zuma disagreed with her understanding of her authority in the matter.

Opposition parties Economic Freedom Fighters and Democratic Alliance approached the Constitutional Court to enforce Madonsela's findings after they were ignored by Zuma and dismissed in Parliament. On 31 March 2016, the Constitutional Court delivered a unanimous judgement stating that the Public Protector's report was binding and Zuma and the National Assembly failed to uphold the country's constitution. The court ordered the National Treasury to determine the amount that Zuma must pay back, and ordered Zuma to do so within 45 days of the court's approval of the National Treasury report.

"State of Capture" report

Madonsela's final report, "State of Capture", was released as her 7-year term of office came to an end in October 2016. Her report was a result of the complaint submitted by a Catholic priest, called Father Stanslaus Muyebe.  The report used Wikipedia, News24, Mail & Guardian and opposition part as her sources  state capture including the Gupta family's improper influence over President Jacob Zuma. Madonsela directed the President to appoint a judicial commission of inquiry, headed by a judge named by the Chief Justice. Zuma called the report "political propaganda" and challenged it in court, but the High Court dismissed the challenge in December 2017, finding that Zuma must implement the remedial actions within 30 days, and making a personal costs order against Zuma.

Personal life
Madonsela raised her two children, a boy Musawabantu Fidel and a girl, Wenzile Una as a single parent. Her husband died when the children were very young. In 1980, Madonsela began her career as an assistant teacher at her former school, Evelyn Baring High School, in Swaziland. In 1982 she became an assistant teacher at Naledi High School in Soweto, one of the schools at the center of the 1976 Soweto Uprising. In late July 2018, it was revealed that Madonsela was engaged to Dick Foxton, a public relations consultant.

Awards
2011 – Daily Maverick named her South African Person of the Year for "serving her role as an ombudsman to the exercise of executive power with unwavering commitment to truth".
2014 – Time magazine named her one of the 100 most influential people in the world in the Leaders category and described her as "an inspirational example of what African public officers need to be".
2014 – Glamour Women of the Year awards – named Woman of Courage
2014 – ANN7 South African of the Year
2014 – Transparency International Integrity Award
2015 – Doctor of Law (honoris causa), University of Fort Hare (2013), Stellenbosch University (March), Rhodes University (April) and University of Cape Town (June)
2016 – FW de Klerk Goodwill Award
2016 –  Forbes African Person of the year
2016 – Chosen as one of the BBC's 100 Women
2016 – German Africa Prize
2018 – Order of Merit of the Federal Republic of Germany

Publications

References

External links

Profile of Advocate Thulisile (Thuli) Madonsela: Public Protector-RSA
Who's Who SA – Thuli Madonsela 

Ombudsmen in South Africa
Living people
1962 births
People from Soweto
University of the Witwatersrand alumni
University of Eswatini alumni
Members of the African National Congress
People from Johannesburg
South African women lawyers
20th-century South African lawyers
21st-century South African lawyers
Commanders Crosses of the Order of Merit of the Federal Republic of Germany
BBC 100 Women
20th-century women lawyers
21st-century women lawyers
Fellows of the African Academy of Sciences
Honorary Fellows of the African Academy of Sciences